James Atkinson may refer to:

Sport
 James Atkinson (bobsleigh) (1929–2010), American bobsleigh competitor at the Winter Olympics
 Jamie Atkinson (born 1990), international cricketer for Hong Kong
 James Atkinson (footballer) (born 1995), English goalkeeper for Gretna 2008 
 Jim Atkinson (1896–1956), Australian sportsman from Tasmania
 Jimmy Atkinson (1886 – after 1910), English footballer for Bolton Wanderers and others

Other fields
 James Atkinson (surgeon) (1759–1839), English surgeon and bibliographer
 James Atkinson (software developer), founder of the phpBB project
 James Atkinson (inventor) (1846–1914), inventor of the Single-Stroke combustion engine in 1882
 James Atkinson (Persian scholar) (1780–1852), published one of the earliest translations of the Shahnameh in English
 James Atkinson (JP), first mayor of Crewe, England
 James Atkinson (Australian politician) (c. 1820–1873), New South Wales politician
 James Atkinson (physicist) (1916–2008), radar pioneer
 James Henry Atkinson (1849–1942), British ironmonger who invented the mousetrap
 James Atkinson (theologian) (1914–2011), Church of England priest and academic

Fictional
 James Atkinson (Neighbours), fictional character from the soap opera Neighbours